Ebed can refer to:
 Ebed (biblical figure), the name of two biblical figures
 Obid, Slovak village and municipality